Gymnetis merops is a species of scarab beetle in the family Scarabaeidae.

References

Cetoniinae
Beetles described in 2018